Medinaraopalem is a village in Eluru district of the Indian state of Andhra Pradesh. It is administered under of Eluru revenue division.

Demographics 

 Census of India, Medinaraopalem has population of 2611 of which 1341 are males while 1270 are females. Average Sex Ratio is 947. Population of children with age 0-6 is 253 which makes up 9.69% of total population of village, Child sex ratio is 874. Literacy rate of the village was 65.95%.

References

Villages in Eluru district